My Fairy Tales  is the fifth album by singer Nneka, released on March 2, 2015. It was her first independent release on her own label Bushqueen Music. According to Nneka, the release is "a project as opposed to a whole album". Musically there are "reggae influences as well as Afrobeats and hi-life. Lyrically, it's conscious, it's empowering and it's motivating; discussing political issues, as well as issues that affect us on a day-to-day basis".

Track listing

Charts

References 

2015 albums
Nneka (singer) albums